This is a list of publicly accessible, motorable passes in the Western Cape province, South Africa.

See also 
Mountain Passes of South Africa

References 
 Wild Dog Adventure Riding, South Africa

Western Cape
Mountain passes
Mountain passes of Western Cape
Mountain passes of Western Cape